Marsha K. Ternus is an American lawyer who served as a justice of the Iowa Supreme Court from September 7, 1993, to December 31, 2010. As a Justice, Ternus was part of the unanimous Iowa Supreme Court ruling legally recognizing same-sex marriage in Iowa, and was removed from office after a judicial retention election, following campaigning by groups opposed to same-sex marriage including the National Organization for Marriage. In 2012, Ternus received a Profile in Courage Award from the John F. Kennedy Library Foundation, along with fellow Justices David L. Baker and Michael Streit.

From 2013 to 2016, she was Director of the Harkin Institute for Public Policy.

References

External links

Justices of the Iowa Supreme Court
Living people
American women judges
Women chief justices of state supreme courts in the United States
Year of birth missing (living people)
Chief Justices of the Iowa Supreme Court
21st-century American women
Drake University Law School alumni
University of Iowa alumni
20th-century American women judges
20th-century American judges
21st-century American women judges
21st-century American judges
Iowa Women's Hall of Fame Inductees